In enzymology, a UDP-N-acetylmuramate—L-alanine ligase is an enzyme that catalyzes the chemical reaction

ATP + UDP-N-acetylmuramate + L-alanine  ADP + phosphate + UDP-N-acetylmuramoyl-L-alanine

The 3 substrates of this enzyme are ATP, UDP-N-acetylmuramate, and L-alanine, whereas its 3 products are ADP, phosphate, and UDP-N-acetylmuramoyl-L-alanine.

This enzyme belongs to the family of ligases, specifically those forming carbon-nitrogen bonds as acid-D-amino-acid ligases (peptide synthases).  The systematic name of this enzyme class is UDP-N-acetylmuramate:L-alanine ligase (ADP-forming). Other names in common use include MurC synthetase, UDP-N-acetylmuramoyl-L-alanine synthetase, uridine diphospho-N-acetylmuramoylalanine synthetase, UDP-N-acetylmuramoylalanine synthetase, L-alanine-adding enzyme, UDP-acetylmuramyl-L-alanine synthetase, UDPMurNAc-L-alanine synthetase, L-Ala ligase, uridine diphosphate N-acetylmuramate:L-alanine ligase, uridine 5'-diphosphate-N-acetylmuramyl-L-alanine synthetase, uridine-diphosphate-N-acetylmuramate:L-alanine ligase, UDP-MurNAc:L-alanine ligase, alanine-adding enzyme, and UDP-N-acetylmuramyl:L-alanine ligase.  This enzyme participates in d-glutamine and d-glutamate metabolism and peptidoglycan biosynthesis.

Structural studies

References

 
 
 

EC 6.3.2
Enzymes of known structure